Route 609 or Highway 609 may refer to:

Canada
  Alberta Highway 609

Costa Rica
 National Route 609

United States
  Kentucky Route 609
  Louisiana Highway 609
  New Mexico State Road 609
  Ohio State Route 609
 Texas
  Farm to Market Road 609
  Virginia State Route 609